The following squads were named for the 1952 Summer Olympics tournament.

Austria

Head coach: Viktor Hierländer

Hans Arnold, A. Rouschal, Johann Weiß and Erwin Theuerweckl were all named in Austria's squad, but did not play in any matches:

Brazil

Head coach: Newton Cardoso

Evaristo, Arízio, Bené, Amaury, Antoninho, Paulinho, Wassil, Marcos Guerra and Cacá were all named in Brazil's squad, but did not play in any matches:

Bulgaria

Head coach: Krum Milev

Gavril Stoyanov, Minko Minchev, Ivan Nikolov, Todor Kapralov, Atanas Tsanov, Lazar Hristov, Ivan Trendafilov, Georgi Kekemanov and Kostadin Blagoev were all named in Bulgaria's squad, but did not play in any matches:

Chile

Head coach: Luis Tirado

Denmark

Head coach: Axel Bjerregaard

Egypt

Head coach:  Edward Jones

Ahmed Katou, Nour El-Dali, Mohammed Abdallah, Fahmi Jemei, Ibrahim Saleh, Ad-Diba, Essam Bahig and El-Sayed El-Attiyah were all named in Egypt's squad, but did not play in any matches:

Finland

Head coach: Aatos Lehtonen

France

Head coach:

Germany

Head coach: Sepp Herberger

Great Britain

Head coach: Walter Winterbottom

Greece

Head coach: Antonis Migiakis

Hungary

Head coach: Gusztáv Sebes

India

Head coach: S. A. Rahim

Byomkesh Bose, Samir Roy, P. B. A. Saleh and Runu Guha Thakurta were all named in India's squad, but did not play in any matches:

Italy

Head coach: Giuseppe Meazza

Luxembourg

Head coach:  Adolf Patek

Netherlands

Head coach: Jaap van der Leck

Netherlands Antilles

Head coach: Antoine Maduro

Norway

Head coach:  Frank Soo

Poland

Head coach: Michał Matyas

Tadeusz Glimas and Zbigniew Jaskowski were both named in Poland's squad, but did not play in any matches:

Romania

Head coach: Gheorghe Popescu I

Sweden

Head coach:  George Raynor

Tore Svensson, Lars Carlsson, Karl-Erik Andersson, Sven Hjertsson, Åke Jönsson, Lars Eriksson, Nils-Åke Sandell and Egon Jönsson were all named in Sweden's squad, but did not play in any matches:

Turkey

Head coach:  Sandro Puppo

Fevzi Büyükyıldırım, Cahit Candan, Hadi Pozan, Ekrem Koldaş, Kaya K., Ergün İ. and were all named in Turkey's squad, but did not play in any matches:

United States

Head coach: John Wood

Andy Keir and Marty Krumm were both named in the United States' squad, but did not play in any matches:

Soviet Union

Head coach: Boris Arkadyev

Yugoslavia

Head coach: Milorad Arsenijević

References

Sources
 FIFA
 RSSSF
 Yugoslavia squad at Serbian Olympic committee
 Great Britain team at British Olympic Association 
 Denmark squad at DBU 
 Sweden medalists at Swedish Olympic committee
 List of Luxembourgian olympic footballers at ALO
 Match report at voetbalstats.nl
 Greece – International Matches 1948-1960, RSSSF (Alexander Mastrogiannopoulos)
  List of Norwegian international footballers
 El equipo que fue Chile, Puro Naval.cl
 Brazil Olympic Matches

Squads
1952 Summer Olympics